Henri Weewauters (born 8 November 1875, date of death unknown) was a Belgian sailor who competed in the 1908 Summer Olympics and in the 1920 Summer Olympics. In 1908 he won the silver medal in the 6 metre class with the Belgian boat Zut. Twelve years later he was a crew member of the Belgian boat Antwerpia V, which won the bronze medal in the 8 metre class.

References

External links 
 
 
 

1875 births
Year of death missing
Belgian male sailors (sport)
Sailors at the 1908 Summer Olympics – 6 Metre
Sailors at the 1920 Summer Olympics – 8 Metre
Olympic sailors of Belgium
Olympic silver medalists for Belgium
Olympic bronze medalists for Belgium
Olympic medalists in sailing
Medalists at the 1908 Summer Olympics
Medalists at the 1920 Summer Olympics